Safia Al Sayegh (born 23 September 2001) is an Emirati professional racing cyclist, who currently rides for UCI Women's WorldTeam UAE Team ADQ.

Major results
2019
National Road Championships
1st  Road Race
1st   Time Trial
4th Road Race, Asian Junior Cycling Championships
2022
National Road Championships
1st  Road Race
1st   Time Trial
 3rd  Time trial, Asian Road Championships
Arab Road Cycling Championships
2nd Road Race
2023
1st  Road Race
1st   Time Trial

References

External links
 

2001 births
Living people
Emirati female cyclists